Russell David Johnson (November 10, 1924 – January 16, 2014) was an American actor.  He played Professor Roy Hinkley in Gilligan's Island and Marshal Gib Scott in Black Saddle.

Early life
Johnson was born in Ashley, Pennsylvania, on November 10, 1924, to Russell Kennedy Johnson (1901–1932) and Marion Wenonah Smink Johnson (1902–1976).

Johnson was the eldest of seven siblings: Kenneth Walter Johnson (1925–2012), David Reed Johnson (1926–1976), Lois Marion Johnson (1927–1928), Lorraine Johnson Crosby (1928-2015), Marion Joan Johnson Reeves (1930–2010), and Paul Wesley Johnson (1932–1933). His father Russell died of lobar pneumonia and influenza on December 13, 1932, and his brother Paul also died of lobar pneumonia on January 5 the following year. His mother Minnie remarried after 10 years
to Thomas S. Lewis.

As a teenager, Johnson attended Girard College, a private boarding school for fatherless boys, located in Philadelphia.

Military career
After graduating from high school, Johnson enlisted in the United States Army Air Forces as an aviation cadet. On completing his training, he was commissioned as a second lieutenant. He flew 44 combat missions in the Pacific Theater during World War II as a bombardier in B-25 twin-engined medium bombers.

On March 4, 1945, while flying as a navigator in a B-25 with the 100th Bombardment Squadron, 42nd Bombardment Group, 13th Air Force, Johnson's B-25 and two others were shot down during a low-level bombing and strafing run against Japanese military targets in the Philippine Islands. The B-25s encountered heavy anti-aircraft fire, and all three had to ditch in the sea off Zamboanga. Johnson broke both his ankles in the landing, and his bomber's co-pilot was killed. Johnson received a Purple Heart for his injuries. He was also awarded the Air Medal, the Asiatic-Pacific Campaign Medal with three campaign stars, the Philippine Liberation Ribbon with one campaign star, and the World War II Victory Medal.

Johnson was honorably discharged as a first lieutenant on November 22, 1945, then joined the United States Air Force Reserve.

Movie, television, and radio career

After his honorable discharge from the military, Johnson used the G.I. Bill to pay for his acting studies at the Actors' Lab in Hollywood.

Johnson became a close friend of Audie Murphy and later appeared with him in three of his films, Column South and Tumbleweed in 1953 and Ride Clear of Diablo in 1954. Johnson's Hollywood career began in 1952, with the college fraternity hazing exposé For Men Only, and with Loan Shark, also released in 1952 and starring George Raft.

His early roles were primarily in Westerns such as Rancho Notorious (1952, starring Marlene Dietrich), Seminole (1953), Law and Order (1953, opposite Ronald Reagan), and Badman's Country (1958), and science fiction films such as It Came from Outer Space (1953), This Island Earth (1955), Attack of the Crab Monsters (1956), and The Space Children (1958). He also appeared in a Ma and Pa Kettle vehicle, Ma and Pa Kettle at Waikiki (1955), as well as in  Roger Corman's rock-'n'-roll crime drama Rock All Night (1957). In 1955, he had a role in Many Rivers to Cross along with Alan Hale Jr., later the Skipper from Gilligan's Island. Johnson and Hale also appeared together in an episode of the TV series Casey Jones, Season 1 Episode 20 "The Track Walker".

During the 1950s, he played the head of a gang of crooks in episode 17 of season one of The Adventures of Superman (originally broadcast in January 1953, filmed in 1951). Johnson was also cast on the religion anthology series Crossroads.

In 1957 he played a ruthless and heartless murdering outlaw named "Stranger" (so out of character from his future "Professor" role) on the TV Western Gunsmoke in the episode "Bloody Hands" (S2E21), where he almost convinces Matt Dillon to quit from guilt because of his own constant need to kill. He returned to that series in 1959 as “Harry Webb” in the episode “The Bear”.  He also played the Sundown Kid in an episode of the 1958 NBC's Western series Jefferson Drum and guest-starred in another NBC Western series, The Californians. He appeared in episodes of Wagon Train, "The Beauty Jamison Story" and "The Cliff Grundy Story."

He appeared four times on the first-run syndicated military drama The Silent Service, based on actual stories of the submarine section of the United States Navy. He was cast as Hugh Grafton in episode 28, "The Gar Story", as the executive officer Beach in the 1957 "Tirante Plays a Hunch", appeared twice as submarine officer and later author  Edward L. Beach Jr., and as Tom Richards in two 1960 episodes, "Intermission" and "The Desperate Challenge", and twice with June Allyson on her CBS  anthology series The DuPont Show with June Allyson.  Also, he guest-starred with William Shatner in "The Hungry Glass", a 1961 episode of Thriller, and with Joan Evans and Harvey Stephens in "The Sky Diver", the unaired pilot episode of Ripcord  of that same year. Then he was cast as John T. Metcalf in the 1962 episode "Mile-Long Shot to Kill" of the CBS anthology series GE True, hosted by Jack Webb. Also, in 1962, he was cast as Bob Murkland in the 6 March Season 3, episode 22 of Laramie, 'The Dynamiters'. In April of that same year, he was cast as Doctor Ross in the episode "Allergies Anonymous" of The Real McCoys.  Also that year he played a role in Tales of Wells Fargo.  Then in 1963, he was cast in the episode "Mutiny at Fort Mercy" of the short-lived ABC/Warner Bros.' Western series The Dakotas, and later he performed in the premiere of another short-lived ABC show, Breaking Point, a medical drama series starring Paul Richards and Eduard Franz.

From January 1959 to May 1960, Johnson co-starred as Marshal Gib Scott on the television series Black Saddle, which lasted two seasons—its first on NBC and its second on ABC.

Twilight Zone and Outer Limits episodes
Johnson appeared in two episodes of The Twilight Zone. His character brings a murderer from 1880 into the present via a time machine in the season-one episode "Execution". In the season-two episode "Back There", his character, Peter Corrigan, attempts to prevent the assassination of Abraham Lincoln. The plot of both episodes involved time travel from the 20th to the 19th centuries.  Johnson also appeared on The Outer Limits in 1964, playing a crewmember on a United States space station in the episode "Specimen: Unknown".

"The Professor" on Gilligan's Island

Johnson was best known for playing Professor Roy Hinkley (usually called the "Professor"), the very knowledgeable polymath who could build all sorts of inventions out of the most rudimentary materials available on the island. As Johnson himself pointed out, though, he could not fix the hole in the boat. In the first episode of the show, the radio announcer describes the Professor as a research scientist and well-known scoutmaster. Gilligan's Island aired from 1964 to 1967, but has been shown in reruns continuously ever since. Johnson reprised this character in three Gilligan's Island made-for-television movies and two animated series. In a 2004 interview, Johnson commented about the role and shared his perspective regarding Gilligan's Island and the situation comedy's place in television history:

After Gilligan's Island

After Gilligan's Island, Johnson found himself somewhat typecast, making portraying more unsophisticated roles other than his signature role as the Professor more difficult. Nevertheless, he was able to resume a sufficient acting career, appearing in several other movies and television shows, especially the latter. He appeared as a guest star in several dramatic series, including The Big Valley with Peter Breck (marking a reunion of sorts, since they co-starred together in Black Saddle, an earlier Four Star Productions series), The Invaders, Death Valley Days, Owen Marshall: Counselor at Law, Lassie, That Girl, Ironside, The F.B.I, and Gunsmoke. He was cast in the miniseries Vanished, based on a novel by Fletcher Knebel (1971), the TV horror movie The Horror at 37,000 Feet (1973), uncredited in the Robert Redford spy thriller Three Days of the Condor (1975), the low-budget thriller Hitch Hike to Hell (1977), and appeared on the episode "Coffee, Tea or Cyanide" on McMillan and Wife in 1977, and on the NBC soap opera Santa Barbara.

Johnson had a brief appearance in MacArthur (1977), in which he played United States Navy Admiral Ernest J. King, and he appeared in the 1978 made-for-television movies The Ghost of Flight 401 and The Bastard. Russell provided the narration for the animated-short episodes of The Adventures of Stevie and Zoya that appeared on MTV during the mid-1980s.

In an interview with Starlog magazine in the early 1980s, Johnson said that he had wanted to appear in the original Star Trek during its run on NBC from 1966 to 1969, but he was never cast. An episode of CBS' Newhart featured the Beavers (a men's organization) watching a Gilligan's Island episode on television. When they are suddenly evicted from the room, one of them, portrayed by Johnson, protests, "I want to see how it ends!" He is assured that the castaways do not get off the island.  Johnson also played the sheriff in several episodes of season 9 of Dallas.  His character in that series did not return in season 10, however, as season 9 turned out to be the infamous "dream season". In the late 1980s horror TV series Monsters, Johnson played an elder scientist in the episode Sleeping Dragon, in which he tries communicating with an ancient humanoid dinosaur that was awakened after a 65 million years-long slumber.

Johnson entertained fans at the 1996 MST3K Conventio-Con-Expo-Fest-a-Rama 2: Electric Boogaloo on the "Celebrity Panel". Johnson was invited for his role in the movie-within-a-movie of Mystery Science Theater 3000: The Movie, This Island Earth, but spent most of the time answering questions about his Gilligan's Island days. He shared an amusing anecdote: 

Johnson once participated in the Ig Nobel award presentation ceremony, credited as "The Professor Emeritus of Gilligan's Island".

Johnson had a number of guest roles in the radio series "The Adventures of Harry Nile", one of the "Imagination Theater" series produced by Jim French.

Personal life
Johnson was married three times. His first marriage, to Edith Cahoon in 1943, ended in divorce in 1948.

In 1949 he married his second wife, Kay Cousins, whom he had met while at the Actors' Lab in Hollywood. Together they had a daughter, Kim, and a son, David. Cousins died on January 20, 1980, in Century City, California.

In 1982, Johnson married Constance "Connie" Dane, and became stepfather to her son, Courtney Dane. It was here that Johnson collaborated with writer Steve Cox on the memoir, "Here on Gilligan's Isle," published in 1993.

Russell's son David Johnson died of AIDS-related complications on October 27, 1994. After his son's diagnosis with AIDS, Johnson frequently helped raise money for AIDS charities.

Death
Johnson died from kidney failure at his home in Bainbridge Island, Washington, on January 16, 2014, aged 89. His remains were cremated. Johnson's memorial service was held a month later.

Filmography

References

Further reading
Johnson, Russell and Cox, Steve. Here on Gilligan's Isle. New York: Perennial, 1993.

External links 
 
 Russell Johnson at Turner Classic Movies
 
 
 Russell Johnson Interview with the Archive of American Television, 2004

1924 births
2014 deaths
American male film actors
American male television actors
United States Army Air Forces personnel of World War II
Aviators from Pennsylvania
Deaths from kidney failure
Male actors from Los Angeles
Male actors from Pennsylvania
Military personnel from Pennsylvania
People from Ashley, Pennsylvania
Recipients of the Air Medal
Shot-down aviators
United States Army Air Forces officers
Writers from Pennsylvania
HIV/AIDS activists
United States Army reservists